The Aucayacu massacre was a selective massacre that occurred on 6 August 1986 in the Peruvian city of Aucayacu (Huánuco). The attack was directed at gay men and sex workers. Those responsible for the attack were members of the Shining Path terrorist group during the internal conflict in Peru. The massacre was carried out as part of the "social cleansing" policies that the group carried out on the Northeast Front.

Context 
The Shining Path (Communist Party of the Peru - Sendero Luminoso [PCP-SL]) and the Túpac Amaru Revolutionary Movement (MRTA) were terrorist organisations of the extreme left who had initiated a conflict against the Peruvian state in the 1980s. They exhibited very hostile behaviour towards sectors that they not sympathetic to their ideological positions, especially state officials. Their hostility was not only limited to their political opponents, they were also against all advances regarding sexual and women's minority rights, which they saw as a consequence of capitalism.

Background
Shining Path created the so-called Popular Open Committees in the territories that it controlled. These committees governed the sexual development of the inhabitants, as well as ensuring the population under their rule did not depart from traditional sexual canons.

The Truth and Reconciliation Commission identified the following:

Massacre
On 6 August 1986, in the city of Aucayacu, capital of the José Crespo Y Castillo District, members of the Shining Path kidnappped 10 people, including gay men and female prostitutes. According to the Shining Path, these individuals were "social blots". The number of each group and details was not specified. The massacre came to be approved by the population.

Condemnation
The mass murders of homosexuals and sex workers during the conflict is considered one of the greatest acts of misogyny, homophobia, and violent actions against prostitution in the country. It is also classified as a sample of exacerbated masculinity and a legacy of internalised discrimination against sexual minorities in parts of the rural population.

See also
 Communism and LGBT rights
 Femicides in Peru
 Homophobia
 LGBT rights in Peru
 List of massacres in Peru
 Prostitution in Peru
 Socialism and LGBT rights
 Violence against LGBT people

References

Massacres in Peru
Internal conflict in Peru
Victims of Shining Path
1986 in Peru
LGBT rights in Peru
Homophobia
Prostitution in Peru
Crimes against sex workers
Violence against gay men
History of Huánuco Region
1986 in LGBT history
1986 murders in Peru